Rita Panahi (born 3 March 1976) is an American-born Australian right-wing opinion columnist. She works for The Herald and Weekly Times (HWT), a subsidiary of News Corp Australia and is the host of The Rita Panahi Show and The Friday Show on Sky News Australia and is a contributor to Sunrise on the Seven Network. She is on the radio at 3AW and 2GB.

Early life and education
Rita Panahi was born in Pine Bluff, Arkansas, United States, the child of Iranian parents. Her mother was a midwife and her father was an agricultural engineer. The family returned to Iran during her infancy, living on the coast and moving to Tehran by 1979. Her mother worked for a hospital associated with the Shah during the Iranian Revolution.

Panahi described her parents as "relaxed Muslims who were not particularly political". However, her family was targeted by the Shia Islamist government of the Ayatollah Khomeini. In 1984, they were accepted by Australia as refugees and lived in Melbourne.

Panahi worked in banking while attending Monash University, studying but not completing a Bachelor of Business Finance. She joined Australian Young Labor and volunteered in the 1996 election campaign. Panahi worked as a personal banker at Colonial Mutual and was the youngest branch manager in the company's history. She has a child with an undisclosed father and was a single parent as of 2016.

Media career
Panahi initially wrote for the daily free commuter newspaper mX, writing a weekly sports gossip column. Her column was picked up for a second year and by 2007 she was a regular guest on the AM sports radio station SEN. She earned her MBA from Swinburne. In September 2007, Panahi began  working for the Herald Sun, published by the Herald and Weekly Times (HWT), a subsidiary of News Corp Australia. Panahi is also a regular guest on Sky News Australia and Sunrise on the Seven Network. She is also a radio commentator on 3AW and 2GB.

In March 2018, Panahi began hosting The Friday Show on Sky News Live.

Views
Panahi is described as a conservative. 

She has been described as 'surprisingly' progressive on some social issues. Writing for SBS, Margaret Simons observed that Panahi hates homophobia and has argued in favour of women choosing single motherhood, as she has.

In January 2015, Panahi sparred with Andrew O'Keefe on Weekend Sunrise over Islamic extremists. She said "We've got to stop ... pretending like Islam is like any other religion as far as being behind incidences of terror" and "if you value the rights of women you’d have issues with the burqa". 
In January 2015, she wrote an article entitled "Islam, you have a very serious problem" which was published in the Daily Telegraph. News website New Matilda published an open letter critical of Panahi's article.

In a debate over racism in early 2016, Panahi was on a team opposing ABC presenter Stan Grant. Panahi argued that Australia should not be characterised as racist.

In January 2017, Panahi was encouraged by Michael Kroger to stand for Liberal Party pre-selection in the Victorian state electorate of Frankston.

Islam
She is a former Muslim and is critical of aspects of Islam. Panahi has accused what she regards as the regressive left for abetting Islamism in the West, stating "the former excuse behaviour that they would never tolerate from non-Muslims." She has described Western feminists who view modesty veils such as burkas, niqabs and hijabs as symbols of diversity or empowerment as an example of such abetment. However, she opposes a complete ban on Muslim immigration. She supports offshore detention camps for illegal immigrants, while also supporting asylum seekers who arrive to Australia by boat. She has argued against the burqa and has criticised non-Western women who wear hijabs in solidarity with Muslim women, arguing that the hijab is a political symbol as well as a religious one, and that it was forced on her as a child in Iran. She has supported statements against veils made by fellow former Muslims such as Darya Safai and Yasmine Mohammed.

Republicanism
Panahi has claimed that she was previously in favour of republicanism but now supports retaining the Monarchy of Australia, arguing that monarchy is a flawed system but "the reality is that it works for Australia. We have a stable system of government with a figurehead who is benign, much admired and not interested in interfering in our affairs." She has also expressed opposition to the views of Australian Republican Movement's chairman Peter FitzSimons and agreed with an assessment made by former Senator David Leyonhjelm that debates over the monarchy is a non-issue for average Australians but one obsessively pushed by republicans. However, Panahi has criticised the political statements made by Meghan Markle and Prince Harry, arguing they have "trashed" the legacy of Queen Elizabeth. She has also opined that the crown should be passed down to Prince William in the event of the Queen's death.

In January 2015, Panahi sparred with Andrew O'Keefe on Weekend Sunrise over Islamic extremists. She said "We've got to stop ... pretending like Islam is like any other religion as far as being behind incidences of terror" and "if you value the rights of women you’d have issues with the burqa". 
In January 2015, she wrote an article entitled "Islam, you have a very serious problem" which was published in the Daily Telegraph. News website New Matilda published an open letter critical of Panahi's article.

In a debate over racism in early 2016, Panahi was on a team opposing ABC presenter Stan Grant. Panahi argued that Australia should not be characterised as racist.

In January 2017, Panahi was encouraged by Michael Kroger to stand for Liberal Party pre-selection in the Victorian state electorate of Frankston.

US politics
Ahead of the 2020 United States Presidential election, Panahi maintained that while she had some disagreements and reservations about Donald Trump, she favoured his re-election and argued that a Trump victory would be more beneficial to Australian national security over a Biden presidency. She furthermore accused the media of ignoring the increase in black, gay and Hispanic support for Trump in order to accuse him of racism. Panahi claims Joe Biden has engaged in inappropriate behaviour with young girls and is in a cognitive decline.

References

External links
The Rita Pahahi Show Podcast on Sky News Australia
Rita Panahi's column in the Herald Sun
Growing Up in Iran & Immigrating to Australia - Rita Panahi interview with Dave Rubin

1976 births
Living people
Australian atheists
Australian former Muslims
Australian women journalists
Former Muslim critics of Islam
Former Muslims turned agnostics or atheists
Iranian emigrants to Australia
People from Pine Bluff, Arkansas
Australian critics of Islam
Australian monarchists
Journalists from Melbourne
Monash University alumni
Swinburne University of Technology alumni
Sky News Australia reporters and presenters
American people of Iranian descent